The Ministry of Foreign Affairs is responsible for maintaining the Republic of Latvia's external relations and the management of its international diplomatic missions. The actual Minister of Foreign Affairs is Edgars Rinkēvičs, a member of the Unity Party and former State Secretary within Latvia's Ministry of Defence.

Diplomacy
The ministry directs Latvia's affairs with foreign entities, including bilateral relations with individual nations and its representation in international organizations, including the United Nations, European Union, Council of Europe, NATO, the Organization for Security and Co-operation in Europe, the International Monetary Fund, the World Trade Organization, and its participation in the Schengen Area. It oversees visas, cooperation with expatriates, international human rights policy, transatlantic defense policy and various global trade concerns. The ministry also contributes to Latvia's international trade and economic development, in collaboration with the Ministry of Economics (Latvia) and the Investment and Development Agency of Latvia.

Inspector General

The Inspector General for the Ministry of Foreign Affairs of Latvia is appointed by the Minister of Foreign Affairs. The current Inspector General for the Ministry of Foreign Affairs of Latvia is Normans Penke.

List of Ministers

Jānis Jurkāns (22 May 1990 - 10 November 1992)
Georgs Andrejevs (10 November 1992 - 7 June 1994)
Valdis Birkavs (19 September 1994 - 16 July 1999)
Indulis Bērziņš (16 July 1999 - 7 November 2002)
Sandra Kalniete (7 November 2002 – 9 March 2004)
Rihards Pīks (9 March 2004 – 19 July 2004)
Artis Pabriks (21 July 2004 – 28 October 2007)
Māris Riekstiņš (8 November 2007 – 28 April 2010)
Aivis Ronis (29 April 2010 – 3 November 2010)
Ģirts Valdis Kristovskis (3 November 2010 - 25 October 2011)
Edgars Rinkēvičs (25 October 2011 – Present)

See also
 Foreign relations of Latvia
 List of diplomatic missions of Latvia

References

External links
 Official Ministry website

Latvia
Government of Latvia